, alternatively titled Magical DoReMi in English, is a Japanese magical girl anime television series created by Toei Animation. It focuses on a group of elementary school girls, led by Doremi Harukaze, who become witch apprentices. The series aired in Japan on TV Asahi between February 1999 and January 2003, spanning four seasons and 201 episodes, and was followed by an original video animation series released between June and December 2004. An English-language version of the first season, produced by 4Kids Entertainment, aired in North America in 2005.

Ojamajo Doremi has inspired two companion films, manga adaptations, video games, and a light novel sequel series. A 20th anniversary film titled Looking for Magical Doremi was released on November 13, 2020.

Plot

Ojamajo Doremi
Due to a curse placed on any witch whose identity is exposed by a human, Majo Rika is transformed into a witch frog. Wanting to return to her original form, Majo Rika makes Doremi her witch apprentice, giving her the ability to cast magic. In order to become a fully-fledged witch capable of turning Majo Rika back into a human, Doremi has to pass nine different witch tests, while also keeping her identity a secret from other humans. Doremi is soon joined by her two best friends, Hazuki Fujiwara and Aiko Seno, and later by her younger sister Pop Harukaze who all become witch apprentices, helping to run the Maho-Do whilst using magic to help out their friends and families. They soon come across a rival witch apprentice, Onpu Segawa, who has been using forbidden magic to influence people's memories. While initially cold towards the other girls, Onpu soon warms up to them. Finally they successfully passed the final test. However, their identities are revealed to their families and friends. Onpu wipes the memories of those that attempt to expose them to prevent their identities from being revealed. She uses forbidden magic too many times, losing control of it. In order to save Onpu from an eternal sleep, the girls give up their magical powers to awaken her.

Ojamajo Doremi # (Sharp)
At the start of the fourth grade, Doremi and the others, who sneak into the Witch World to visit Majo Rika, witness the birth of a magical baby, who is given the name Hana and will be the candidate for the next queen. As witch law dictates that whoever witnesses a magical baby's birth must take care of it for a year, Doremi and the others are once again made witch apprentices, tasked with raising Hana. While also taking care of the Maho-Do, which has now become a gardening store, the girls must ensure Hana's growth and help her pass several health examinations held by the Witch World's head nurse, Majo Heart. Meanwhile, a wizard named Oyajide attempts to kidnap Hana to help aid the Wizard World, later enlisting the help of four young wizards known as the Flat 4, who tried to get close Doremi and the others to kidnap Hana, but liked them later. Finally, the witch apprentices help mend relations between the Witch and Wizard Worlds. However, Hana's powerful magic catches the past queen of the Witch World's attention, who slept in the cursed forest  for some reason. She cursed Hana to make her sick, only the Love Supreme Flower that grow in the cursed forest can heal her. At the end Doremi and the others succeeded in picking the flowers but were cursed to fall into eternal sleep. Then Hana wake up them with her powerful magic and thoughts of them, but they also lost their witch identity.

Mōtto! Ojamajo Doremi
As the Queen of the Witch World pleads to the other witch senates to make Doremi and the others witches again, half of the senates are opposed to the decision. Thus, the Queen offers a compromise in that the girls, who are made into apprentices again, must pass six patissière exams in order to become full witches. With the Maho-Do remodeled into a bakery, Doremi and the others are joined by Momoko Asuka, a returnee from America who initially has little experience with Japanese outside of using a special intercom, to help them bake sweets needed for their exams. Midway through the series, Hana is afflicted by a curse from the past queen again, causing her to have a dislike for vegetables which are necessary for her magical growth, prompting Doremi and the girls to get another chance to take care of Hana and help her get over her pickiness. After curing Hana's pickiness and passing the patissière exams, the girls appeal to the past queen, Majo Tourbillon, who had despised humans ever since she lost her human husband and grandchildren. They made her favorite dessert in her memory, the cake her husband made when he proposed to her, then she undoing a curse placed upon a forest, where her true form is found sleeping, protected by magical vines. 

OVA series, Ojamajo Doremi Na-i-sho!, takes place during this time frame.

Ojamajo Doremi Dokkān!
Hana, who has gotten bored of the Witch World and wants to be with Doremi and the others, uses all of her magic to instantly grow up and become a sixth grader. This results in the Maho-Do being transformed into a crafts shop and Hana's magical crystals shattering, requiring Doremi and the others to supply her with the energy needed to become a witch apprentice. Meanwhile, the Queen discovers Majo Tourbillon's power will eventually cause all worlds to be put to sleep. As such, the Queen tasks the girls, who are assisted by Majo Tourbillon's fairy, Baba, to recreate various handmade gifts that Majo Tourbillon's six grandchildren had made and received from her in order to remind her of the happy times and break the vines imprisoning her. The vines soon start spawning black flowers that cause people and magical beings alike to be affected with laziness, with the girls enlisting the help of Hana and a white elephant named Pao to put a stop to them. Finally they managed to wake up Majo Tourbillon. After resolving her misunderstanding with her grandchildren, she lifted the witch frog curse. Girls are finally allowed to become witches, but they are also reminded that if they become full witches, they will live longer than ordinary humans. Eventually they decided not to become witches and learned that they can do anything even without using magic, then combine their respective crystal fragments into a new crystal ball for Hana. The series ends with their elementary school graduation and Majo Rika takes Hana back to the Witch World. Although they each went their separate ways, their friendship remains the same and continue to move towards their dreams.

Media

Anime

Ojamajo Doremi is produced by Toei Animation and ABC. In Japan, the show aired on each of the ANN TV stations (Asahi Broadcasting Corporation (ABC, Japan), TV Asahi, Nagoya TV (Metele), and others) and Broadcasting System of San-in Inc. The show replaced the time slot for Yume no Crayon Oukoku after its end and lasted from February 7, 1999, to January 30, 2000, with a new episode airing every week. The series soon followed with direct sequels, and  until January 26, 2003. Each series lasted from 49 to 51 episodes. On June 26 to December 11, 2004, a thirteen-episode original video animation series,  was produced which takes place during the third season. 

A 26-episode short ONA series, titled , began streaming on Toei Animation's YouTube channel from March 23, 2019. In this series Doremi and her friends as high school students. p A five-episode spin-off adaptation of the picture book , called  was exclusively produced as a reward for the Ojamajo Doremi 20th Anniversary Thanks Festival crowdfunding campaign in 2020.

Toei Animation commissioned an English dub of the pilot episode from Ocean Productions to shop for potential licensors. 4Kids Entertainment licensed the first season in North America under the title Magical DoReMi, which aired on 4Kids TV for the 2005–2006 broadcasting season. Magical DoReMi was heavily edited and localized for US audiences.

Manga
From 2000 to early 2003, the manga magazine Nakayoshi ran a manga-adaptation of Ojamajo Doremi. The story was based on the events of the original anime and was drawn by Shizue Takanashi. The chapters were compiled into tankōbon volumes by Kodansha. Four volumes were released in total — the first three were under the title Ojamajo Doremi, covering the events of the original series and Ojamajo Doremi #. The last volume was adapted from the Mōtto! Ojamajo Doremi story arc and was titled eponymously to it.

Films

Ojamajo Doremi #: The Movie
 was the first theatrical release for the series and was directed by Takuya Igarashi. Roughly twenty-seven minutes long, it was released on July 8, 2000 (along with Digimon Hurricane Touchdown!! / Supreme Evolution!! The Golden Digimentals), for the 2000 Summer Toei Anime Fair. The Digimon movie was split into two parts and Ojamajo Doremi #: The Movie was screened in between.

In the movie, Pop has just passed one of her witch exams, but gets into a heated argument with Doremi because Hana followed her into the Witch World. Initially unbeknownst to everyone, the flower Pop brought home from the Witch World is really the Witch Queen Heart, the Queen's favorite flower, which grants any wish it hears regardless of any possible dangers until it begins to bear seeds. One of the wishes it had granted involves turning Doremi into a mouse, unknowingly made by Pop over her anger towards Doremi. While Pop goes to search for her sister, the other girls track down the runaway flower before it starts to reproduce.

The Secret of the Frog Stone
 was the series' second theatrical release. It was directed by Shigeyasu Yamauchi and hit theaters on July 14, 2001, screened between Digimon Tamers: Battle of Adventurers and Kinnikuman: Second Generations.

During Doremi and her friends' summer vacation, they visit her grandparents in the fictional mountains of Fukuyama, where they hear of a mysterious legend of Mayuri and Zenjuro, two star-crossed lovers that died in the Edo period. During the next morning, when they investigate the forest, the girls get lost and face the Curse of the Full Moon, which makes them unable to use magic. Meanwhile, due to a traumatizing memory, Aiko develops a fear of Doremi's grandfather.

Looking for Magical Doremi

 is a 2020 anime film released for the franchise's 20th anniversary. The film focuses on three adults, Sora Nagase, Mire Yoshigaki, and Reika Kawatani, who watched Ojamajo Doremi when they were children. Staff members who worked on the original anime series will be returning to the project, including Junichi Sato and Haruka Kamatani as directors, Midori Kuriyama as screenwriter, and Yoshihiko Umakoshi as the character designer. The voice actresses from the original series will reprise their roles. Three new characters were revealed on October 29, 2019, at the Tokyo International Film Festival, as well as returning staff members art designer Kenichi Tajiri and color artist Kunio Tsujita. The film was originally scheduled to be released in theaters on May 15, 2020, but it was postponed due to the COVID-19 pandemic. It was released nationwide on November 13, 2020.

Music

Throughout the run of the series, multiple singles, albums, and compilations were distributed. The original series' CD's were released under Bandai Music Entertainment, while music from Ojamajo Doremi # was distributed by King Records. From Mōtto! Ojamajo Doremi onwards, the CDs were distributed by Marvelous Entertainment.

Light novel
On September 5, 2011, Kodansha Limited announced the coming of the light novel Ojamajo Doremi 16, featuring the original work of Izumi Todo, story written by Midori Kuriyama, and illustrations by Yoshihiko Umakoshi. It was published in three volumes by Kodansha between December 2, 2011, and November 30, 2012. The story takes place several years after the events of the anime series, with the main characters now in high school. It was followed by a second series, Ojamajo Doremi 17, released in three volumes between July 2, 2013, and February 28, 2014, and a third, Ojamajo Doremi 18, released in two volumes between September 2, 2014, and June 2, 2015. The final volume, Ojamajo Doremi 19, was released on December 9, 2015. Drama CDs were included with the first Ojamajo Doremi 17 novel, the third Ojamajo Doremi 17 novel, and Ojamajo Doremi 19. Toei producer Hiromi Seki has expressed interest in producing an anime adaptation of the series, but stated it would depend on sales. Following the announcement of the new movie, a new light novel volume,  Ojamajo Doremi 20’s, was announced for release in summer 2019, but it was delayed to October 2, 2019. Yumi Kageyama replaced Midori Kuriyama as author for this installment.

Ojamajo Kids
During the run of Ojamajo Doremi Dokkān!, Toei hosted live events with dance performances by select actresses who portrayed the girls, titled "Ojamajo Kids". These girls were selected via auditions.

 Kasumi Suzuki – Doremi Harukaze
 Tsugumi Shinohara – Hana Makihatayama
 Miiya Tanaka – Hazuki Fujiwara
 Chiharu Watanabe – Aiko Senoo
 Makoto Takeda – Onpu Segawa
 Chisato Maeda – Momoko Asuka

Video games
The franchise received few video games, most of them educational games for children.

Sega Pico series
Three games has been released for the Sega Pico, containing several minigames for children:

Ojamajo Doremi Sharp (circa 2000)
Mo-tto! Ojamajo Doremi (circa 2001)
Ojamajo Doremi Dokkan! (circa 2002)

PlayStation games
Four games has been released for the Sony PlayStation, three of them part of the KidsStation educational line-up:

Ojamajo Doremi Sharp Maho-dou Dance Carnival! (September 21, 2000), a musical game similar to Dance Dance Revolution mechanics.
Mo-tto! Ojamajo Doremi: Maho-dou Smile Party (July 26, 2001), composed with minigames and activities.
Ojamajo Doremi Dokkan: Maho-dou Eigo Festival (March 20, 2002), the third KidsStation line-up release for this series. It is a software for teaching English.
Ojamajo Doremi Dokkan: Nijiiro Paradise (November 28, 2002), a party video game based on board and dice.

Other platforms
 Ojamajo Adventure: Naisho no Mahou (November 19, 2004), a visual novel for PC, featuring the exclusive character Majorythm.

Merchandise

Bandai produced a toy line for Ojamajo Doremi. Maki Takahashi served as the toy line's supervisor, and a character was named after her in the show as an homage. In 2000, Bandai originally planned to market Ojamajo Doremi in North America through a partnership with Mattel, but the toy line was dropped. After 4Kids Entertainment picked up the series for North American distribution, they signed a marketing deal with Bandai America in August 2005 to distribute a toy line beginning in Q2 2006.

Beginning 2015, Premium Bandai produced limited edition goods and a make-up line for the franchise's 15th anniversary, targeted towards women. In the following years, Ojamajo Doremi has also collaborated with other fashion and character brands including SuperGroupies, The Ichi, Liz Lisa, Favorite, The Kiss, Ichiban Kuji, Sanrio, and Earth Music & Ecology.

Legacy

Puyopuyo!! Quest brought the Ojamajo Doremi collaboration event, featuring Doremi, Hazuki, Aiko, Onpu and Momoko with the first season outfit and their original voices, Majorika, and also the recurring characters Amitie, Spica, Sonia, Tilura and Kirin with the Ojamajo outfit, available as playable characters. The event ran between November 15 to 25, 2019.

In October 2020, Ojamajo Doremi partnered with the Bushiroad mobile game BanG Dream! Girls Band Party! to promote Looking for Magical Doremi. As part of the collaboration, the BanG Dream! band Hello, Happy World! received in-game costumes based on the main characters of Ojamajo Doremi and performed a cover version of the first season's opening theme.

Reception
By the time the third season was broadcast, the viewership rating was 13.7% and 90% of the target demographic were watching the show.

References

External links

 Official Ojamajo Doremi website at Toei Animation 
 Official Ojamajo Doremi Sharp website  at Toei Animation 
 Official Motto! Ojamajo Doremi website at Toei Animation 
 Official Ojamajo Doremi Dokkan website at Toei Animation 
 Official Ojamajo Doremi Na-i-sho website at Toei Animation 
 Information in English about Ojamajo Doremi, Sharp, Motto!, Dokkan and Naisho at Toei Animation
 

Ojamajo Doremi series
1999 anime television series debuts
2000 anime television series debuts
2001 anime television series debuts
2002 anime television series debuts
2004 anime OVAs
Japanese children's animated action television series
Japanese children's animated adventure television series
Japanese children's animated comedy television series
Japanese children's animated fantasy television series
Kodansha Ranobe Bunko
Anime with original screenplays
Magical girl anime and manga
Toei Animation original video animation
Toei Animation television
TV Asahi original programming
Animated television series about children
Witchcraft in anime and manga
Witchcraft in written fiction
Witchcraft in television